Several special routes of U.S. Route 70 exist. In order from west to east, these special routes are as follows.

Alternate routes

Brownsville–Huntingdon alternate route

U.S. Route 70 Alternate (US 70A) is an alternate route to US 70 between Brownsville, and Huntingdon in West Tennessee. Signage along this route, and on most maps, show it as US 70A and not US 70 Alternate.

Humboldt bypass route

U.S. Route 70A Bypass (US 70 Bypass or US 70A Byp.) is a bypass route of US 70A in Humboldt, Tennessee. It runs concurrently with US 79 Bypass and unsigned SR 366 for its entire length.

Pine Level alternate route

U.S. Route 70 Alternate (US 70A) was established around 1953, replacing the old mainline US 70 through Pine Level. Originally, it started in Smithfield along US 301 going north to Selma, then east through Pine Level to its eastern terminus near Princeton. In the early 1970s, it was rerouted east from Selma to Wilson's Mills along formerly secondary roads. In 1993, it was truncated at its current western terminus when US 70 was rerouted along the Wilson Mills-Selma route.

Business loops

Alamogordo business loop

Hugo business loop

It starts at US 70 outside of Hugo and goes into Hugo. In the center of town, it starts running concurrently with U.S. Route 271 Business until they both end outside of Hugo at an interchange with the Indian Nation Turnpike, U.S. Route 271 and US 70.

De Queen business route

U.S. Route 70 Business (US 70B and Hwy. 70B) is a  business route of U.S. Route 70 in Sevier County, Arkansas. On May 23, 2017, AASHTO received and approved recognition of the business route.

Glenwood business route

U.S. Route 70 Business (US 70B or Hwy. 70B) is a  business route of U.S. Route 70, along East Broadway, in Glenwood, Arkansas. the route begins at US 70 in Glenwood, where it runs due west through a residential area before going southwest and through the downtown business district, ending at AR 8. The route was created by the Arkansas State Highway Commission (ASHC) on August 2, 1962, following construction of a US 70 bypass around town to the south. On May 23, 2017, AASHTO received and approved recognition of the business route.

Hot Springs business loop

U.S. Route 70 Business (US 70B or Hwy. 70B) is a  business route of U.S. Route 70 in Garland County, Arkansas.

US 70B begins at an interchange with US 70/US 270 (Dr. Martin Luther King Jr Expressway) in southwest Hot Springs. The highway travels along Airport Road and passes Memorial Field Airport before beginning an overlap with US 270B. The two highways travel along Albert Pike Road before turning north onto Sumner Street then turn east onto West Grand Avenue. US 70B intersects Highway 7 near downtown, with the overlap with US 270B ending a few blocks to the east. The highway becomes a freeway near the Gulpha Gorge Campground at Hot Springs National Park. The freeway passes near Magic Springs and Crystal Falls through more rural areas of Hot Springs before ending at an interchange with US 70.

Junction list

Huntingdon business loop

US Route 70 Business (US 70 Bus.) is a business loop and former segment of mainline US 70 in Huntingdon, Tennessee, which also shares a hidden concurrency with SR 1. The route runs along West Main Street until reaching the heart of town where it encounters and off-center roundabout centering on the historic Carroll County Courthouse, shared in an overlap with TN Bus 22. East of the courthouse, the route runs along East Main Street.

Camden business loop

US 70 Business (US 70 Bus.) is a business loop in Camden, which also shares a hidden concurrency with SR 391.

Dickson business loop

US 70 Business (US 70 Bus.) is a business loop in Dickson, which also shares a hidden concurrency with SR 235. Both routes run along West College Street and East College Street.

Lebanon business loop

U.S. Route 70 Business (US 70 Bus.) is a  business route that replaced US 70 through downtown Lebanon, via Main Street. SR-24 is the "hidden" state route along its entire length.

Marshall business loop

U.S. Route 70 Business (US 70 Bus.) was established in 1960 (extended in 1981) and co-signed with US 25 Business, this business loop replaced the old US 70 route through downtown Marshall, via Main Street and Ivy River Road. Route is part of the French Broad Overview Byway.

Morganton business loop

U.S. Route 70 Business (US 70 Bus.) was established in 1960 from a renumbering of US 70A, this business loop goes through downtown Morganton via Union and Meeting Streets. Part of the route is shared with US 64 Business and NC 181.

Hillsborough business loop

U.S. Route 70 Business (US 70 Bus.) was established in 1960 from a renumbering of US 70A, this business loop goes through downtown Hillsborough via Revere Road, Corbin Street, and Church Street. Part of the route is shared with NC 86. Originally, it entered Hillsborough via Hill Avenue and King Street before 1963.

Durham business loop

U.S. Route 70 Business (US 70 Bus.) was established in 1960 from a renumbering of US 70A, this business loop goes through downtown Durham via the current alignment of Hillsborough Road, 9th Street, Main/Morgan Street, Dillard Street, Holloway Street, and Miami Boulevard. Part of the route is shared with NC 98. The route has had various alignment change through the years.

Clayton–Smithfield business loop

U.S. Route 70 Business (US 70 Bus.) was established in 1993, it replaced the old mainline US 70 through Smithfield. In 2008 it was extended west, replacing the old mainline US 70 through Clayton.

Goldsboro business loop

U.S. Route 70 Business (US 70 Bus.) was established in 1960 from a renumbering of US 70A, this business loop goes through downtown Goldsboro via Grantham Street, George Street, and Ash Street. Part of the route is shared with US 117 Business.

Kinston business loop

U.S. Route 70 Business (US 70 Bus.) was established in 1960 from a renumbering of US 70A, this business loop goes through downtown Kinston via Vernon Avenue and Queen Street. The route also shared with US 258 Business.

New Bern business loop

U.S. Route 70 Business (US 70 Bus.) was established in the early 1970s, it replaced the old mainline US 70 through downtown New Bern, via Clarendon Boulevard, Neuse Boulevard, and Front Street. The route is shared with US 17 Business and NC 55.

Bypass routes

Durant bypass

Idabel bypass

Selma bypass

Established in July 1997, US 70 Bypass is part of a rare oddity known as the four US 70s of Selma-Smithfield: US 70, US 70A, US 70 Business, and US 70 Bypass. In an effort to make the area less confusing, NCDOT opted for the Bypass designation as opposed to another business loop. The purpose of the bypass was to avoid traffic tie-ups at I-95 and US 301; the bypass itself is freeway-grade with no interchanges, in which I-95 traffic has to use the mainline US 70 to access either direction from Selma.

Goldsboro bypass

U.S. Route 70 Bypass (US 70 By-pass) is an approximately  controlled-access highway bypassing north of Goldsboro, connecting with US 70 west of Goldsboro and west of La Grange. It was approved by AASHTO on September 25, 2015, with its official establishment dependent on its completion; at the time, the current completed sections were temporarily signed as NC 44. On May 27, 2016, the last section, the eastern section from Wayne Memorial Drive to US 70 west of La Grange, was completed, and the road was officially renamed the US 70 Bypass.  The route is part of Future Interstate 42.

Former alternate routes

Morganton alternate route

U.S. Route 70 Alternate (US 70A) was established in 1937 or 1938, as a downtown alternate route of US 70 along Meeting Street. By 1953 it was decommissioned; however, its routing would be reestablished by US 70 Business in 1960.

Hickory alternate route 1

U.S. Route 70 Alternate (US 70A) was established in 1946 as a new alternate route bypassing south of Hickory. In 1948, it was replaced by US 70.

Hickory alternate route 2

U.S. Route 70 Alternate (US 70A) was established in 1948 after US 70 was rerouted south bypassing Hickory. In 1956 or 1957, the route was decommissioned and downgraded to secondary roads; known today as US HWY 70A (SR 1007), 1st Ave SW/SE (SR 1692) and Highland Avenue (SR 1007).

Salisbury alternate route

U.S. Route 70 Alternate (US 70A) was established in 1938 as a new alternate routing bypassing downtown Salisbury. The route began at the intersection of Innes Street, going east along Mahaley Avenue/Confederate Avenue, then southeast on Club Drive/11th Street, ending at North Main Street. In 1957, US 70A was replaced by US 70; which lasted for four years before reverting onto Innes Street. After 1961, the routing was downgraded to secondary road (SR 1910) before the state eventually handed the former alternate route to the city of Salisbury.

Lexington alternate route

U.S. Route 70 Alternate (US 70A) was established in 1952 as a renumbering of US 70 through Lexington. Sharing a concurrency with US 29A, it traveled along Main Street. In 1960 it was renumbered as US 70 Business.

High Point alternate route 1

The first U.S. Route 70 Alternate (US 70A) in High Point was established in 1934 as a renumbering of NC 10A; the entire route was in concurrency with US 29A. It went north along Westchester Drive then east on Lexington Road/Greensboro Road back to US 29/US 70. Around 1948, this alignment was replaced by US 29/US 70.

High Point alternate route 2

The second U.S. Route 70 Alternate (US 70A) in High Point was established around 1948 after US 29/US 70 switched to follow the first alternate alignment through the city; the entire route was in concurrency with US 29A. The alternate route now followed English Road, Main Street and Montlieu Avenue before reconnecting US 29/US 70 at Greensboro Road. In 1957, US 70A was decommissioned, while US 29A remained.

High Point–Greensboro alternate route

U.S. Route 70 Alternate (US 70A) was established in 1952 as a renumbering of US 70 through downtown Thomasville. In 1960, US 70A through downtown Thomasville was replaced by US 70 Business. In 1962, US 70A westbound was rerouted from Spring Garden and Fairground streets onto Lee and Aycock streets, in Greensboro. Around 1963, US 70A eastern terminus was truncated at O. Henry Boulevard; everything east from that point was reverted to US 70. In 1966 and again in 1968, US 70A was rerouted on various splits through downtown Greensboro. In 1969, US 70A was rerouted to use Lee Street to Murrow Boulevard, then north to Summit Avenue. Around 1991, the entire route was decommissioned, most of it becoming secondary, except for English Road continuing as NC 68.

Greensboro alternate route

U.S. Route 70 Alternate (US 70A) was established in 1938 as a new alternate routing through downtown Greensboro, via Fairground Avenue (Chapman Street?) and Market Street; the entire rout was in concurrency with US 29A. By 1949, it was extended south to Lee Street, but was moved back to its terminus along Spring Garden Street by 1953. In 1957 it was decommissioned when US 29/US 70 was rerouted onto freeways and its former alignment absorbed by High Point's US 70A.

Hillsborough alternate route 1

The first U.S. Route 70 Alternate (US 70A) in Hillsborough was established in 1942 as a new alternate bypass north of downtown. It was replaced by US 70.

Hillsborough alternate route 2

The second U.S. Route 70 Alternate (US 70A) in Hillsborough was established in 1948 when US 70 replaced the first alternate route bypassing north of downtown. It traversed along Hill and King Streets, replaced in 1960 by US 70 Business.

Durham–Raleigh alternate route

U.S. Route 70 Alternate (US 70A) was established in 1934 as a renumbering of NC 10A, which traveled from Chapel Hill Street, in downtown Durham, southeast on Main Street and Angier Avenue, to Miami Boulevard, in Bethesda. In 1937, US 70A was extended southeast into Raleigh, via Glenwood Avenue, Peace, Person, Edenton, and East Streets, ending at Lenoir Street; this replaced NC 9. In 1948, US 70A was replaced by US 70.

Durham alternate route

U.S. Route 70 Alternate (US 70A) was established in 1948 when US 70 replaced the first alternate connecting Durham and Raleigh. Starting at Roxboro Road, it traveled through downtown Durham via Main, Alston, and Angier Avenue; at Bethesda, it goes south along Miami Boulevard and Chapel Hill Road into Cary, then going east along Western Boulevard into Raleigh, where it connects with Boylan Avenue, South, Fayetteville, Lenoir and finally East Street, where it reconnects with US 70. Between 1950-1953, US 70A was divided on one-way alignments in downtown Raleigh: eastbound used South to East streets, westbound used Lenoir to Saunders streets. By 1952, US 70A was rerouted west from Bethesda onto and overlapping with US 70 to Holloway street, where it went into the downtown area along Roxboro, Pettigrew, Chapel Hill, Duke, Main, and 9th streets before connecting onto Hillsborough Road. US 70A then continued on Bennett Memorial Drive before reconnecting again with US 70; Angier Street was downgraded to a secondary road (SR 1926). Around 1956, US 70A was truncated at the new Durham Bypass freeway. Miami Boulevard, south of Bethesda, downgraded to a secondary road (SR 1959); NC 54 replaced it in Cary; US 64 replaced it from Cary into Raleigh. In 1960, US 70A was replaced by US 70 Business, except for Bennett Memorial Drive, which was downgraded to secondary road (SR 1313).

Smithfield alternate route

U.S. Route 70 Alternate (US 70A) was established between 1945-1949 as a new alternate route through downtown Smithfield, via Second and Hancock Streets. By 1953, it was decommissioned and returned to the Smithfield.

Goldsboro alternate route

U.S. Route 70 Alternate (US 70A) was established in 1956 or 1957, it followed the old US 70 route through downtown Goldsboro; it was replaced by US 70 Business in 1960.

Kinston alternate route

U.S. Route 70 Alternate (US 70A) was established in 1956 or 1957, it followed the old US 70 route through downtown Kinston; it was replaced by US 70 Business in 1960.

Former business loops

Pomona business loop

Benton city (business) loop

U.S. Route 70C (US 70C, the "C" for "City", i.e., a business loop) formerly ran between what is now Interstate 30 (I-30) exits 116 (Sevier & South Streets) and 118 (Congo Road) in Benton, Arkansas. Though it was largely the result of a rerouting of US 70 and US 67 from Little Rock around downtown Benton in 1955, most of which later became I-30, it was not created until 1959 after US 70 was further rerouted between Benton and Hot Springs.

History

Since the place where US 67 and US 70 separated was moved by both reroutings—first in 1955 from downtown Benton to present-day I-30 exit 117 (AR 5/AR 35) just north of downtown where the new route crossed old US 70 (now AR 5 north of I-30 and AR 35 south of it), then in 1959 to present-day I-30 exit 111 (Arkansas Health Center) near Haskell—most of US 70C was actually the pre-1955 route of US 67, of which only present-day Military Road north of AR 35 was also the pre-1955 route of US 70. The only exception was at the eastern end; since there was no interchange where the pre-1955 US 67/US 70 route crossed I-30 just outside Benton, US 70C used Congo Road from Military Road to present-day I-30 Exit 118.

When the rerouted US 67/US 70 was formally designated as I-30 in 1960, US 70C also became Benton's I-30 business loop. Both loops were decommissioned by 1975. The entire route was taken over by the City of Benton, except for a short section of Military Road added to AR 88 to connect it with AR 35.

Little Rock business loop
 

The segment of present U.S. 70 from where it leaves Interstate 30 at Exit 132 (University Avenue) in Little Rock, Arkansas, to I-30 Exit 141B (Broadway) in North Little Rock, was signed as U.S. 70B from the mid-1970s to the mid-2000s. It was previously the route of U.S. 70 as well as U.S. 67; it was also the I-30 Little Rock business loop until that route was deleted earlier in the 1970s.

Before U.S. 70B was created, U.S. 70 ran concurrently with I-30 from Exit 111 (Hot Springs) near Haskell to Exit 132, as it does today. Its U.S. 67 concurrency fell between two different U.S. 67 concurrencies with I-30; one (shared with U.S. 70) was from Exit 114 (then Arkansas State Hospital, now Arkansas Health Center) near Haskell to Exit 132, while the other (shared with U.S. 65 & 167) was from Exit 141B to the end of I-30 at Exit 143B (I-40), also in North Little Rock.

While U.S. 70B was active, U.S. 70 continued its concurrency with I-30 past Exit 132 to Exit 141B, where it returned to its original route. U.S. 67 also moved to I-30 when U.S. 70B was created, thus making its concurrency with I-30 continuous from Exit 114 to the end of I-30. Both concurrencies were shared with U.S. 65 & 167 beginning at Exit 138B (Pine Bluff-El Dorado, now the beginning of Interstate 530). However, many Arkansas state highway maps continued to show U.S. 70B as U.S. 67 & 70, and sometimes even as the I-30 business loop (years after it was officially deleted).

Although I-30 signs at Exit 132 still refer to University Avenue as U.S. 70B and claim U.S. 70 East continues on I-30 East, and I-30 signs at Exit 141B refer only to U.S. 70 East (U.S. 70 West formerly joined I-30 West at that exit), all signs on the business loop were changed back to U.S. 70 in the mid-2000s, thus officially truncating U.S. 70's concurrency with I-30 at Exit 132. U.S. 67 did not return to this route; it remains concurrent with I-30 from Exit 114 (and U.S. 65 & 167 from Exit 138B) to the end of I-30.

Lexington business loop

Established in 1960 from a renumbering of US 70A, it originally went through downtown Lexington via Main Street. It was decommissioned by 2002.

Thomasville business loop

Established in 1960 from a renumbering of US 70A, it originally went through downtown Thomasville via Main Street and Turner Street; it was in concurrence with US 29 Business. It was decommissioned by 1968.

Garner business loop

Established in 1986 after US 70 moved onto the Raleigh beltline. The business loop was removed in 1994 when US 70 moved back to its original route through Garner.

Former temporary routes

Kirby–Lockesburg temporary route

U.S. Highway 70 Temporary was a designation for a route between Kirby and Lockesburg, Arkansas while a new alignment of US 70 was under construction. The designation was removed on July 18, 1956. The highway overlapped Highway 27 between Kirby and Nashville before turning onto Highway 24 (now US 371) between Nashville and the US 71 junction in Lockesburg.

Beaufort business loop

U.S. Route 70 Business (US 70 Bus.) was the designation of secondary roads that mostly follow along the former US 70 route through downtown Beaufort. The routing in question ran south along Turner Street (SR 1174) then east on Cedar Street (SR 1493) and transitions onto Live Oak Street as it goes northeasterly before reconnecting with US 70. Signage of US 70 Bus. possibly appeared soon after the mainline US 70 rerouting on new bypass route north of Beaufort in January 2018, confirmed with Google Street View imagery from July 2018. The routing does not exist on NCDOT mapping/records nor was it submitted to AASHTO for approval. The road was decommissioned in October 2019 and was given to the city of Beaufort.

References

External links

70
70
U.S. Route 70
70
70
70
70
70